Friedrich Hopfner (28 October 1881 – 5 September 1949) was an Austrian geodesist, geophysicist and planetary scientist.

As an officer of the Austro-Hungarian Empire he began his scientific work at the Bureau of Meteorology. In 1921 he became Chief Astronomer at the new Geodetic Survey of Austria (Federal Office for Metrology and Survey or Bundesamt für Eich- und Vermessungswesen). From 1936 to 1942 and from 1945 to 1949 he was a professor at the Vienna University of Technology (TU Wien) and over the 1948-9 term he was the university's rector.

Life 

He was born on 28 October 1881 in Trautenau, northern Bohemia (now Trutnov, Czech Republic). He studied mathematics, physics, geophysics and astronomy at the University of Prague and the University of Munich between 1899 and 1904. In 1905 at the Charles University in Prague he delivered his dissertation on "The average and relative distribution of temperature on the Earth's surface."

His first job was as an assistant at the Prague Observatory, and then at the Bureaux of Meteorology in Berlin, Innsbruck and Vienna. In 1908 he transferred to the Maritime Observatory in Trieste (now the Istituto Talassografico di Trieste or ITT), then in 1912 to the Bureau of Geodesy (Gradmessungsbüro) in Vienna.

During World War I he was head of the meteorological service for the Isonzo Army of Austria-Hungary. In 1921 he became Chief Astronomer at the new Geodetic Survey of Austria ("Bureau of Weights, Measures and Surveying" or Bundesamt für Eich- und Vermessungswesen).

In 1936 he was appointed Professor of Theoretical Geodesy and Spherical astronomy at the Vienna University of Technology, as successor to Richard Schumann. In autumn 1942 he declined Hitler's invitation into his newly created Academy of Sciences (Akademie der Wissenschaften) in Prague, and was forced into retirement, moving with his family to Schönbühel on the Danube, where he devoted himself exclusively to research. After the war he was restored to his position in Vienna, and was later elected Dean of the Faculty of Applied Maths and Physics.

His pleasant friendliness made him popular with colleagues and students, and in the 1948-9 term he was voted Rector magnificus at the Technical High School of Vienna. In the last month of his incumbency, he drowned in a boating accident on the Hintersteiner See, near Kufstein.

Work 
From the very beginning of his career he made valuable contributions to astronomy, geodesy, geophysics and meteorology, in the applied fields as well as the theoretical, and published a great deal on all four subjects. He wrote three well-known textbooks.

Trajectories of planetoids 
Hopfner's early work was mostly concerned with astronomy and meteorology. In collaboration with Johann Palisa, he determined the trajectories and ephemerides of a number of planetoids.

Mathematical foundations of a theory of climatology 
In 1906 he began researching problems bordering both astronomy and geophysics, starting with the warming of the Earth by the Sun. We owe mainly to Hopfner the sharp distinction he made between the daily and seasonal average irradiation. In 1927 he went into the subject in more detail, laying out his discoveries in his Mathematical Foundations of an Astronomical Theory of Climatic Variation (Mathematische Grundlagen zu einer astronomischen Theorie der Klimaschwankungen), which won him the Seegenpreis.

Research on tides 
His work at the Maritime Observatory in Trieste led him to study oceanographical questions, for example on tides and the determination of water levels in Trieste harbour, both very important practical problems.

Geodesy and geophysics 
With his entry to the Gradmessungsbüro in 1921 he turned to geodesy and geophysics, in particular his work on the meridian arc measurement Großenhain-Kremsmünster-Pola, which detailed the use of comparisons of vertical deflections. Later he studied the important problem of the geoid (the Earth's shape), for example through the reduction of observations of weight and the subject known as isostasy (the study of gravitational equilibrium within the Earth). From the 1930s he concentrated on the study of the reference ellipsoid and phase diagrams, as well as the elliptical shape of the Equator, the level spheroid, and the triaxial Jacobi ellipsoid.

Contributions to Austrian science 
Hopfner did pioneering work on the determination of geographical distances without the use 
of wires (the first employment of time-signals), as well as on gravimetry. His study of the Earth's magnetic field helped make a name for the ZAMG, or Central Institute for Meteorology and Geodynamics (Zentralanstalt für Meteorologie und Geodynamik) in Vienna.

Memberships and responsibilities 
 Member of the Austrian Academy of Sciences
 President of the Austrian Geodetic Commission (ÖKIE, now ÖGK)
 Correspondent to the Central Institute for Meteorology and Geodynamics (ZMG)
 Corresponding member of the German Society for Science and the Arts in the Republic of Czechoslovakia
 Member of the Mathematical Society of Vienna

Awards 
 1912 Oskar Freiherr von Rothschild-Preis for astronomy, from the Vienna Academy of Sciences
 1923 Seegenpreis from the Society for the Promotion of German Science, Art and Literature in Bohemia
 1931 Given the title Hofrat (Counsellor)
 1977 The Austrian Geodetic Commission begins awarding the Friedrich Hopfner-Medaille in his honour; it is given every four years for outstanding work in the field of geodesy

Bibliography 
Hopfner published a total of eighty-one works. In this partial list, the three textbooks are indicated with bold type.
 1905 "Die Verteilung der solaren Wärmestrahlung auf der Erde", Monthly Weather Review (1906).
 1907 "Untersuchungen über die Bestrahlung der Erde durch die Sonne mit Berücksichtigung der Absorption der Wärmestrahlen durch die Atmosphärische Luft nach dem Lambert'schen Gesetz. Erste Mitteilung: Analytische Behandlung des Problems." (pp. 167–234) in: Über das Vorkommender seltenen Erden auf der Sonne, Wien, Verlag Hölder
 1913 "Die Gezeiten im Hafen von Triest", Wien, Verlag Hölder, in: Sitzungsberichte der Akademie der Wissenschaften, Math.-Nat. Klasse, Abt.2a; Bd.122, Heft 9, Wien
 1922 "Der :de:Meridianbogen Großenhain-Kremsmünster-Pola" (with R. Schumann), Astro-geodätische Arbeiten Österreichs, Neue Folge Bd.1
 1927 Mathematische Grundlagen zu einer astronomischen Theorie der Klimaschwankungen
 1927 Die Figur der Erde, Bundesverlag Wien
 1931 "Neue Wege zur Bestimmung der Erdfigur." (Ergebnisse der Kosm. Physik Bd.1), Leipzig
 1931 "Die Gezeiten der Meere" in Handbuch der Experimentalphysik
 1933 "Die Gezeiten der festen Erde" in Gutenberg's Handbuch der Geophysik
 1933 Physikalische Geodäsie (Mathematik und ihre Anwendungen, Bd. 14), Akademischer Druck, Leipzig
 1936 "Figur der Erde, Dichte und Druck im Erdinnern" in Gutenberg's Handbuch der Geophysik Bd.1, pp. 139–308, Berlin
 1949 Grundlagen der Höheren Geodäsie (Erdmessung), Wien, Springer-Verlag.

External links 
 Österreich-Lexikon 
 F. Hopfner in der Deutschen Enzyklopädie 
 Ehrungen: Österreiche Geodätische Kommission, Friedrich Hopfner-Medaille 
  Verleihungskriterien der Friedrich Hopfner-Medaille 

1881 births
1949 deaths
Deaths by drowning
Ludwig Maximilian University of Munich alumni
Austrian geodesists
20th-century Austrian astronomers
Accidental deaths in Austria
Charles University alumni
Academic staff of TU Wien
German Bohemian people
People from Trutnov